Le Sac des Filles is the first album by Camille.

The title is literally translated as 'The Bag of the Girls', referencing a woman's purse.

Track listing
"1, 2, 3"
"Paris"
"La Demeure d'un ciel"
"Les Ex"
"Mon petit vieux"
"Ruby" (written by Euston Jones)
"Le Sac des filles" "
"Un homme deserté"
"Je ne suis pas ta chose"
"Elle s'en va"
"Là où je suis née"

References

Camille (singer) albums
2001 debut albums